Dmytro Volodymyrovych Zozulya (born 9 June 1988) is a Ukrainian professional football defender.

External links
 
 

1988 births
Living people
Footballers from Kyiv
Ukrainian footballers
FC Obolon-Brovar Kyiv players
FC Obolon-2 Kyiv players
FC Knyazha Shchaslyve players
FC Lviv players
FC Volyn Lutsk players
FC Bukovyna Chernivtsi players
FC Naftovyk-Ukrnafta Okhtyrka players
Expatriate footballers in Georgia (country)
FC Guria Lanchkhuti players
Ukrainian expatriate footballers
Ukrainian expatriate sportspeople in Georgia (country)
FC Zugdidi players
Association football midfielders
FC Arsenal Kyiv players
FC Hirnyk-Sport Horishni Plavni players
FC Kremin Kremenchuk players
FK Andijon players
FC VPK-Ahro Shevchenkivka players
Ukrainian Premier League players
Ukrainian First League players
Ukrainian Second League players
Ukrainian Amateur Football Championship players
Expatriate footballers in Uzbekistan
Ukrainian expatriate sportspeople in Uzbekistan